Ventus is an American company founded in 1999 and headquartered in Norwalk, Connecticut that provides secure private line wireless services, and manufactures cellular wireless hardware.

Ventus 

Ventus provides managed network solutions for cellular wireless networking and fixed line services including PCI-DSS (Payment Card Industry) compliant data transport, integration services, data encryption, and integrated network administration and monitoring systems. Ventus' IT services are delivered via products developed by the company's network hardware technologies division.

Ventus Technologies 

Ventus Technologies designs and manufactures cellular routers and other wireless hardware for machine-to-machine and enterprise wireless applications. Ventus' hardware includes dual-carrier, modular, multi-interface embedded wireless 4G LTE/3G routers and multi-band cellular antennas.

Products and Services 
Services & Applications
Managed Network Solutions for Business
Build: From pre-sales engineering to network management to build and pilot, single source for network connectivity
Host: All solutions are hosted to preserve continuity, speed new deployments, and facilitate technical support
Deploy: Scalability is seamless with Ventus project management, field services, and plug-and-play hardware
Maintain: Comprehensive monitoring and 24x7x365 access to expert tech support keep networks up and stable
Managed Wireless WAN (WWAN) solutions Ideal for: ATMs, ITMs, BTMs, lottery, gaming, self-service kiosks, Member of ATMIA, vending machines, POS (Point of Sale), digital signage, security cameras/DVRs, remote device monitoring, alarm panels, VoIP (Voice over IP)
Managed Wi-Fi solutions
Managed SD-WAN, Hybrid WAN, and WAN solutions for chain locations, branch offices, retail, temporary, mobile, and pop-up sites
Managed  failover for business continuity with 4G LTE Backup for fixed-line connections
Source from local, regional, and national network service providers: Wireless, Ethernet, MPLS, Broadband (DSL, Fiber, FiOS), Dedicated Internet Access (DIA)

Hardware & Software
Ventus designs network solutions around Ventus Technologies proprietary routers and routing equipment from third-party manufacturers including Cisco, HP, Fortinet, and other leading CPE vendors.
All hardware is pre-configured and plug-and-play ready prior to deployment. 
4G LTE and 5G dual-carrier; high-gain and wideband antennas, signal amplifiers, protocol converters, networking equipment
Security features include firewall, VPN, and high-level encryption

Management & Monitoring
Managed Network Solutions include network architecture design, hardware provisioning and network connectivity, on-site installation management, monitoring, maintenance, and technical support

Technical Support
24x7x365 Technical Support Center, Network Operations Center Support (NOC), Field Installation and Deployment Services, Engineering Support

In addition, Ventus is certified as meeting the Payment Card Industry's (PCI) Data Security Standards (DSS).

References

External links 
Official Website

1999 establishments in New York (state)
Companies based in Norwalk, Connecticut
American companies established in 1999
Computer companies established in 1999
Manufacturing companies based in Connecticut
Networking companies of the United States
Networking hardware companies